The 1984–85 Denver Nuggets season was their 18th season, and their ninth in the NBA.

In the playoffs, the Nuggets defeated the San Antonio Spurs in five games in the First Round, then defeated the Utah Jazz in five games in the Semi-finals, before losing to the eventual NBA champion Los Angeles Lakers in five games in the Conference Finals.

Draft picks

Roster

Regular season

Season standings

Notes
 z, y – division champions
 x – clinched playoff spot

Record vs. opponents

Game log

Regular season

|- align="center" bgcolor="#ccffcc"
| 1
| October 27, 1984
| Golden State
| W 125–121
|
|
|
| McNichols Sports Arena
| 1–0
|- align="center" bgcolor="#ffcccc"
| 2
| October 30, 1984
| @ San Antonio
| L 118–126
|
|
|
| HemisFair Arena
| 1–1

|- align="center" bgcolor="#ccffcc"
| 3
| November 1, 1984
| Chicago
| W 129–113
|
|
|
| McNichols Sports Arena
| 2–1
|- align="center" bgcolor="#ccffcc"
| 4
| November 3, 1984
| @ Kansas City
| W 128–114
|
|
|
| Kemper Arena
| 3–1
|- align="center" bgcolor="#ffcccc"
| 5
| November 5, 1984
| @ L.A. Clippers
| L 104–107
|
|
|
| Los Angeles Memorial Sports Arena
| 3–2
|- align="center" bgcolor="#ccffcc"
| 6
| November 6, 19848:30p.m. MST
| @ L.A. Lakers
| W 146–130
| English (28)
| Natt (8)
| Lever (18)
| The Forum11,272
| 4–2
|- align="center" bgcolor="#ccffcc"
| 7
| November 8, 1984
| Portland
| W 128–125
|
|
|
| McNichols Sports Arena
| 5–2
|- align="center" bgcolor="#ccffcc"
| 8
| November 10, 1984
| Utah
| W 147–135
|
|
|
| McNichols Sports Arena
| 6–2
|- align="center" bgcolor="#ccffcc"
| 9
| November 13, 1984
| Phoenix
| W 122–110
|
|
|
| McNichols Sports Arena
| 7–2
|- align="center" bgcolor="#ccffcc"
| 10
| November 16, 1984
| Houston
| W 119–102
|
|
|
| McNichols Sports Arena
| 8–2
|- align="center" bgcolor="#ccffcc"
| 11
| November 20, 1984
| @ Seattle
| W 124–114
|
|
|
| Kingdome
| 9–2
|- align="center" bgcolor="#ccffcc"
| 12
| November 21, 1984
| @ L.A. Clippers
| W 112–106
|
|
|
| Los Angeles Memorial Sports Arena
| 10–2
|- align="center" bgcolor="#ccffcc"
| 13
| November 24, 1984
| Philadelphia
| W 114–110
|
|
|
| McNichols Sports Arena
| 11–2
|- align="center" bgcolor="#ccffcc"
| 14
| November 27, 1984
| L.A. Clippers
| W 139–110
|
|
|
| McNichols Sports Arena
| 12–2
|- align="center" bgcolor="#ffcccc"
| 15
| November 30, 1984
| @ Utah
| L 97–116
|
|
|
| Salt Palace Acord Arena
| 12–3

|- align="center" bgcolor="#ccffcc"
| 16
| December 1, 1984
| Utah
| W 118–111
|
|
|
| McNichols Sports Arena
| 13–3
|- align="center" bgcolor="#ffcccc"
| 17
| December 4, 1984
| @ New York
| L 98–100
|
|
|
| Madison Square Garden
| 13–4
|- align="center" bgcolor="#ffcccc"
| 18
| December 5, 1984
| @ Boston
| L 107–123
|
|
|
| Boston Garden
| 13–5
|- align="center" bgcolor="#ffcccc"
| 19
| December 7, 1984
| @ Detroit
| L 115–122
|
|
|
| Pontiac Silverdome
| 13–6
|- align="center" bgcolor="#ccffcc"
| 20
| December 8, 1984
| @ Cleveland
| W 114–108
|
|
|
| Richfield Coliseum
| 14–6
|- align="center" bgcolor="#ccffcc"
| 21
| December 11, 1984
| Portland
| W 123–122
|
|
|
| McNichols Sports Arena
| 15–6
|- align="center" bgcolor="#ffcccc"
| 22
| December 12, 1984
| @ San Antonio
| L 105–126
|
|
|
| HemisFair Arena
| 15–7
|- align="center" bgcolor="#ffcccc"
| 23
| December 14, 1984
| Kansas City
| L 117–123
|
|
|
| McNichols Sports Arena
| 15–8
|- align="center" bgcolor="#ffcccc"
| 24
| December 16, 1984
| Seattle
| L 101–112
|
|
|
| McNichols Sports Arena
| 15–9
|- align="center" bgcolor="#ccffcc"
| 25
| December 18, 1984
| @ Golden State
| W 126–122 (OT)
|
|
|
| Oakland–Alameda County Coliseum Arena
| 16–9
|- align="center" bgcolor="#ffcccc"
| 26
| December 19, 1984
| Detroit
| L 129–148
|
|
|
| McNichols Sports Arena
| 16–10
|- align="center" bgcolor="#ccffcc"
| 27
| December 21, 1984
| Dallas
| W 116–93
|
|
|
| McNichols Sports Arena
| 17–10
|- align="center" bgcolor="#ffcccc"
| 28
| December 22, 1984
| @ Houston
| L 107–125
|
|
|
| The Summit
| 17–11
|- align="center" bgcolor="#ccffcc"
| 29
| December 26, 1984
| San Antonio
| W 130–119
|
|
|
| McNichols Sports Arena
| 18–11
|- align="center" bgcolor="#ffcccc"
| 30
| December 28, 19847:30p.m. MST
| L.A. Lakers
| L 123–135
| English (31)
| English (9)
| English (8)
| McNichols Sports Arena
| 18–12
|- align="center" bgcolor="#ccffcc"
| 31
| December 29, 1984
| @ Seattle(at Tacoma, Washington)
| W 115–108
|
|
|
| Tacoma Dome
| 19–12

|- align="center" bgcolor="#ffcccc"
| 32
| January 2, 1985
| Houston
| L 111–113
|
|
|
| McNichols Sports Arena
| 19–13
|- align="center" bgcolor="#ffcccc"
| 33
| January 4, 1985
| @ Utah
| L 108–118
|
|
|
| Salt Palace Acord Arena
| 19–14
|- align="center" bgcolor="#ffcccc"
| 34
| January 5, 1985
| L.A. Clippers
| L 115–127
|
|
|
| McNichols Sports Arena
| 19–15
|- align="center" bgcolor="#ccffcc"
| 35
| January 8, 19858:30p.m. MST
| @ L.A. Lakers
| W 126–124
| English (41)
| English (11)
| Evans (9)
| The Forum13,024
| 20–15
|- align="center" bgcolor="#ccffcc"
| 36
| January 9, 1985
| New York
| W 100–95
|
|
|
| McNichols Sports Arena
| 21–15
|- align="center" bgcolor="#ccffcc"
| 37
| January 11, 1985
| Kansas City
| W 143–121
|
|
|
| McNichols Sports Arena
| 22–15
|- align="center" bgcolor="#ffcccc"
| 38
| January 13, 1985
| @ Milwaukee
| L 116–140
|
|
|
| MECCA Arena
| 22–16
|- align="center" bgcolor="#ffcccc"
| 39
| January 14, 1985
| @ Chicago
| L 113–122
|
|
|
| Chicago Stadium
| 22–17
|- align="center" bgcolor="#ccffcc"
| 40
| January 16, 1985
| Golden State
| W 115–107
|
|
|
| McNichols Sports Arena
| 23–17
|- align="center" bgcolor="#ccffcc"
| 41
| January 18, 1985
| Washington
| W 108–106
|
|
|
| McNichols Sports Arena
| 24–17
|- align="center" bgcolor="#ccffcc"
| 42
| January 19, 1985
| @ Portland
| W 123–120
|
|
|
| Memorial Coliseum
| 25–17
|- align="center" bgcolor="#ccffcc"
| 43
| January 24, 1985
| New Jersey
| W 119–110
|
|
|
| McNichols Sports Arena
| 26–17
|- align="center" bgcolor="#ccffcc"
| 44
| January 26, 1985
| Cleveland
| W 144–127
|
|
|
| McNichols Sports Arena
| 27–17
|- align="center" bgcolor="#ccffcc"
| 45
| January 28, 1985
| @ Utah
| W 104–100
|
|
|
| Salt Palace Acord Arena
| 28–17
|- align="center" bgcolor="#ccffcc"
| 46
| January 29, 1985
| Phoenix
| W 128–100
|
|
|
| McNichols Sports Arena
| 29–17
|- align="center" bgcolor="#ccffcc"
| 47
| January 31, 1985
| Dallas
| W 121–110
|
|
|
| McNichols Sports Arena
| 30–17

|- align="center" bgcolor="#ffcccc"
| 48
| February 2, 1985
| @ Houston
| L 128–131 (2OT)
|
|
|
| The Summit
| 30–18
|- align="center" bgcolor="#ffcccc"
| 49
| February 3, 1985
| @ Dallas
| L 106–114
|
|
|
| Reunion Arena
| 30–19
|- align="center" bgcolor="#ffcccc"
| 50
| February 5, 1985
| @ Phoenix
| L 103–108
|
|
|
| Arizona Veterans Memorial Coliseum
| 30–20
|- align="center" bgcolor="#ccffcc"
| 51
| February 6, 1985
| Seattle
| W 120–101
|
|
|
| McNichols Sports Arena
| 31–20
|- align="center"
|colspan="9" bgcolor="#bbcaff"|All-Star Break
|- style="background:#cfc;"
|- bgcolor="#bbffbb"
|- align="center" bgcolor="#ccffcc"
| 52
| February 12, 1985
| Atlanta
| W 131–107
|
|
|
| McNichols Sports Arena
| 32–20
|- align="center" bgcolor="#ccffcc"
| 53
| February 14, 1985
| @ Kansas City
| W 138–123
|
|
|
| Kemper Arena
| 33–20
|- align="center" bgcolor="#ccffcc"
| 54
| February 15, 1985
| San Antonio
| W 129–119
|
|
|
| McNichols Sports Arena
| 34–20
|- align="center" bgcolor="#ccffcc"
| 55
| February 20, 1985
| Boston
| W 132–129
|
|
|
| McNichols Sports Arena
| 35–20
|- align="center" bgcolor="#ffcccc"
| 56
| February 22, 1985
| @ Seattle
| L 123–133
|
|
|
| Kingdome
| 35–21
|- align="center" bgcolor="#ccffcc"
| 57
| February 24, 1985
| Phoenix
| W 117–107
|
|
|
| McNichols Sports Arena
| 36–21
|- align="center" bgcolor="#ccffcc"
| 58
| February 26, 1985
| @ Atlanta
| W 106–94
|
|
|
| The Omni
| 37–21
|- align="center" bgcolor="#ccffcc"
| 59
| February 27, 1985
| @ Washington
| W 124–111
|
|
|
| Capital Centre
| 38–21

|- align="center" bgcolor="#ccffcc"
| 60
| March 1, 1985
| @ Dallas
| W 141–140 (OT)
|
|
|
| Reunion Arena
| 39–21
|- align="center" bgcolor="#ccffcc"
| 61
| March 2, 1985
| Milwaukee
| W 123–122
|
|
|
| McNichols Sports Arena
| 40–21
|- align="center" bgcolor="#ccffcc"
| 62
| March 5, 1985
| Houston
| W 133–131 (2OT)
|
|
|
| McNichols Sports Arena
| 41–21
|- align="center" bgcolor="#ffcccc"
| 63
| March 7, 1985
| @ Kansas City
| L 140–142
|
|
|
| Kemper Arena
| 41–22
|- align="center" bgcolor="#ccffcc"
| 64
| March 9, 1985
| Indiana
| W 126–116
|
|
|
| McNichols Sports Arena
| 42–22
|- align="center" bgcolor="#ffcccc"
| 65
| March 12, 1985
| @ Houston
| L 129–131
|
|
|
| The Summit
| 42–23
|- align="center" bgcolor="#ffcccc"
| 66
| March 15, 1985
| @ Dallas
| L 108–127
|
|
|
| Reunion Arena
| 42–24
|- align="center" bgcolor="#ffcccc"
| 67
| March 17, 1985
| @ San Antonio
| L 119–124
|
|
|
| HemisFair Arena
| 42–25
|- align="center" bgcolor="#ccffcc"
| 68
| March 18, 1985
| Dallas
| W 113–111
|
|
|
| McNichols Sports Arena
| 43–25
|- align="center" bgcolor="#ccffcc"
| 69
| March 20, 1985
| @ Indiana
| W 123–119
|
|
|
| Market Square Arena
| 44–25
|- align="center" bgcolor="#ccffcc"
| 70
| March 22, 1985
| @ New Jersey
| W 123–111
|
|
|
| Brendan Byrne Arena
| 45–25
|- align="center" bgcolor="#ffcccc"
| 71
| March 24, 1985
| @ Philadelphia
| L 103–124
|
|
|
| The Spectrum
| 45–26
|- align="center" bgcolor="#ccffcc"
| 72
| March 26, 1985
| Utah
| W 104–89
|
|
|
| McNichols Sports Arena
| 46–26
|- align="center" bgcolor="#ccffcc"
| 73
| March 28, 1985
| Kansas City
| W 133–115
|
|
|
| McNichols Sports Arena
| 47–26
|- align="center" bgcolor="#ccffcc"
| 74
| March 30, 1985
| Portland
| W 129–117
|
|
|
| McNichols Sports Arena
| 48–26

|- align="center" bgcolor="#ffcccc"
| 75
| April 2, 19857:30p.m. MST
| L.A. Lakers
| L 104–118
| English (31)
| English (12)
| Evans (5)
| McNichols Sports Arena17,022
| 48–27
|- align="center" bgcolor="#ccffcc"
| 76
| April 4, 1985
| @ Phoenix
| W 110–103
|
|
|
| Arizona Veterans Memorial Coliseum
| 49–27
|- align="center" bgcolor="#ccffcc"
| 77
| April 5, 1985
| San Antonio
| W 118–109
|
|
|
| McNichols Sports Arena
| 50–27
|- align="center" bgcolor="#ccffcc"
| 78
| April 7, 1985
| Golden State
| W 130–125
|
|
|
| McNichols Sports Arena
| 51–27
|- align="center" bgcolor="#ffcccc"
| 79
| April 9, 19858:30p.m. MST
| @ L.A. Lakers
| L 119–148
| English (28)
| Kopicki (9)
| Evans (9)
| The Forum17,505
| 51–28
|- align="center" bgcolor="#ffcccc"
| 80
| April 10, 1985
| @ L.A. Clippers
| L 127–129
|
|
|
| Los Angeles Memorial Sports Arena
| 51–29
|- align="center" bgcolor="#ccffcc"
| 81
| April 13, 1985
| @ Golden State
| W 127–120
|
|
|
| Oakland–Alameda County Coliseum Arena
| 52–29
|- align="center" bgcolor="#ffcccc"
| 82
| April 14, 1985
| Portland
| L 112–117
|
|
|
| Memorial Coliseum
| 52–30

Playoffs

|-
|- align="center" bgcolor="#ccffcc"
| 1
| April 18, 1985
| San Antonio
| W 141–111
| Alex English (33)
| Elston Turner (8)
| Fat Lever (11)
| McNichols Sports Arena12,128
| 1–0
|- align="center" bgcolor="#ffcccc"
| 2
| April 20, 1985
| San Antonio
| L 111–113
| Alex English (29)
| Wayne Cooper (10)
| Fat Lever (13)
| McNichols Sports Arena17,022
| 1–1
|- align="center" bgcolor="#ccffcc"
| 3
| April 23, 1985
| @ San Antonio
| W 115–112
| Alex English (27)
| Calvin Natt (8)
| Calvin Natt (8)
| HemisFair Arena8,799
| 2–1
|- align="center" bgcolor="#ffcccc"
| 4
| April 26, 1985
| @ San Antonio
| L 111–116
| Alex English (27)
| Alex English (8)
| Fat Lever (7)
| HemisFair Arena8,621
| 2–2
|- align="center" bgcolor="#ccffcc"
| 5
| April 28, 1985
| San Antonio
| W 126–99
| Alex English (33)
| Calvin Natt (10)
| Fat Lever (10)
| McNichols Sports Arena17,022
| 3–2
|-

|-
|- align="center" bgcolor="#ccffcc"
| 1
| April 30, 1985
| Utah
| W 130–113
| Alex English (31)
| Fat Lever (16)
| Fat Lever (18)
| McNichols Sports Arena11,918
| 1–0
|- align="center" bgcolor="#ccffcc"
| 2
| May 2, 1985
| Utah
| W 131–123 (OT)
| Alex English (26)
| Fat Lever (13)
| Alex English (12)
| McNichols Sports Arena16,317
| 2–0
|- align="center" bgcolor="#ffcccc"
| 3
| May 4, 1985
| @ Utah
| L 123–131
| Calvin Natt (30)
| Mike Evans (8)
| English, Lever (5)
| Salt Palace Acord Arena12,178
| 2–1
|- align="center" bgcolor="#ccffcc"
| 4
| May 5, 1985
| @ Utah
| W 125–118
| Alex English (40)
| Wayne Cooper (14)
| Calvin Natt (10)
| Salt Palace Acord Arena12,716
| 3–1
|- align="center" bgcolor="#ccffcc"
| 5
| May 7, 1985
| Utah
| W 116–104
| Alex English (30)
| Wayne Cooper (11)
| Alex English (6)
| McNichols Sports Arena17,022
| 4–1
|-

|-
|- align="center" bgcolor="#ffcccc"
| 1
| May 11, 19851:30p.m. MDT
| @ L.A. Lakers
| L 122–139
| English (30)
| Issel (8)
| Evans (11)
| The Forum16,109
| 0–1
|- align="center" bgcolor="#ccffcc"
| 2
| May 14, 19859:00p.m. MDT
| @ L.A. Lakers
| W 136–114
| English (40)
| Turner (11)
| Turner (8)
| The Forum17,505
| 1–1
|- align="center" bgcolor="#ffcccc"
| 3
| May 17, 19858:00p.m. MDT
| L.A. Lakers
| L 118–136
| Natt (30)
| Natt (7)
| Turner (6)
| McNichols Sports Arena17,022
| 1–2
|- align="center" bgcolor="#ffcccc"
| 4
| May 19, 19854:00p.m. MDT
| L.A. Lakers
| L 116–120
| Natt, English (28)
| Natt, English (8)
| Turner (10)
| McNichols Sports Arena17,022
| 1–3
|- align="center" bgcolor="#ffcccc"
| 5
| May 22, 19859:30p.m. MDT
| @ L.A. Lakers
| L 109–153
| Cooper (23)
| Schayes (9)
| Lever (6)
| The Forum17,505
| 1–4
|-

Awards, records, and honors
 Vince Boryla, NBA Executive of the Year Award
 T.R. Dunn, NBA All-Defensive Second Team

Player stats

Season

Playoffs

Transactions

References

 Nuggets on Basketball Reference

Denver Nuggets seasons
Den
Denver Nugget
Denver Nugget